Keewaywin (Oji-Cree:ᑮᐌᐎᐣ (Giiwewin), unpointed ᑭᐌᐎᐣ) is a small Oji-Cree First Nation band government in Northern Ontario, located north of Red Lake, Ontario. It is connected to Sandy Lake First Nation by Sandy Lake. It is part of the Keewaytinook Okimakanak Council (Northern Chiefs) and the Nishnawbe Aski Nation. Sandy Lake First Nation Band members separated from Sandy Lake First Nation  to form Keewaywin First Nation. The Indian reserve is entirely surrounded by territory of the Unorganized Kenora District.

Keewaywin is policed by the Nishnawbe-Aski Police Service, an Aboriginal-based service.

References

 Map of Kee-Way-Win at Statcan

Communities in Kenora District
Nishnawbe Aski Nation
Oji-Cree reserves in Ontario